The 378th Infantry Regiment is a unit of the United States Army. It was activated for World War I and World War II. Elements of the organization have been part of the United States Army Reserve since 1947, and participated in the Global War on Terrorism.

History

World War I
The 378th Infantry Regiment was constituted on September 4, 1918 as a unit of World War I's National Army and assigned to the 189th Infantry Brigade, a unit of the 95th Division. The division was organized as a square division and trained at Camp Sherman, Ohio. The Armistice of November 11, 1918 ended the war before the 95th Division had deployed to France to enter the front lines. It was demobilized on November 30, 1918, and its officers and men were discharged or reassigned to other units.

Post-World War I
On June 24, 1921, the 378th Infantry was reconstituted in the Organized Reserves and assigned to the 95th Division (later redesignated the 95th Infantry Division). In January 1922 the regiment was organized with its headquarters in McAlester, Oklahoma. The regiment was ordered to active military service on July 15, 1942, and was reorganized at Camp Swift, Texas.

World War II
The 95th Division was reorganized as a triangular division for World War II, and its brigade headquarters were inactivated. The 377th, 378th, and 379th Infantry Regiments underwent individual soldier and collective unit training at posts in the United States, including Camp Coxcomb, California. In August 1944, the 95th Division arrived in England, and in September it entered combat in France.

From the fall of 1944 until the end of the war in April 1945, the regiments of the 95th Division took part in several campaigns, including, Normandy, Northern France, Rhineland, Ardennes-Alsace, and Central Europe. After the war, the 95th Division returned to the United States, and it was inactivated at Camp Shelby, Mississippi on October 12, 1945.

Post-World War II
On March 14, 1947, the 378th Infantry was reactivated as a unit of the Organized Reserves with its headquarters in Oklahoma City, Oklahoma. In 1952, the Organized Reserve Corps was redesignated the United States Army Reserve. On April 1, 1959 the regiment was reorganized and redesignated the 378th Regiment, a unit of the 95th Division (Training). On September 3, 1962 the regiment's headquarters was moved to Lawton, Oklahoma.

On December 30, 1967, the 378th Regiment was reorganized to consist of the 1st, 2nd, and 3rd Battalions, elements of the Army Reserve's 95th Division (Training). On October 1, 1994, the regiment was reorganized as 1st, 2nd, and 3rd Battalions, elements of the Reserve's 95th Division (Institutional Training). A January 13, 1995 reorganization resulted in the 378th Infantry being designated as 3rd Battalion, 378th Regiment, a unit of the 95th Division (Institutional Training).

On October 16, 1996, the 378th Infantry was reorganized as 1st, 2nd, and 3nd Battalions, elements of the 95th Division (Institutional Training). Following the attacks of September 11, 2001, units of the 95th Division, including the 378th Regiment were ordered to active military duty as part of the Global War on Terrorism. On October 1, 2007, 1st Battalion, 378th Infantry was relieved from assignment to the 95th Division and assigned to the 98th Division (Institutional Training). On September 16, 2008, the 98th Division was redesignated the 98th Training Division. On September 16, 2009,  the 95th Division was redesignated as the 95th Training Division.

Distinctive unit insignia

The 378th Infantry Regiment's distinctive unit insignia (DUI) and coat of arms depict five wigwams, organized in rows of two, one, and two on a blue field. Blue represents the Infantry, and the five wigwams the Five Civilized Tribes of Oklahoma, where the regiment was organized— the  Choctaw, Cherokee, Creek, Chickasaw, and Seminole.

The regiment's motto, Hikia Kallo, appears on the DUI and is a Choctaw phrase that means “Stand Firm.” The coat of arms of the 378th Infantry depicts the statue called The Lexington Minuteman that was sculpted by Henry Hudson Kitson.

Campaign participation credit
The 378th Infantry Regiment's campaign participation credit includes:

World War II
Normandy
Northern France
Rhineland
Ardennes-Alsace
Central Europe

Decorations
2nd Battalion, 378th Infantry is entitled to the following World War II decorations:

Presidential Unit Citation (Army), Streamer embroidered MOSELLE RIVER
French Croix de Guerre with Palm, Streamer embroidered METZ

Notable members
Emmett H. Walker Jr., platoon leader in Cannon Company, 378th Infantry Regiment during World War II. Attained the rank of lieutenant general as Chief of the National Guard Bureau.

References

378